Scott Ryan Sealy (born 4 June 1981, in Chaguanas) is a Trinidadian footballer who most recently played for FC Dallas in Major League Soccer and the father of Dante Sealy.

Career

College
Sealy played college soccer at Wake Forest from 2001 to 2004, where he played in 83 games, starting 73. He scored 43 goals and 22 assists in his career, including 17 goals and 10 assists as a senior, when he was named a second team All-American.

Professional
After graduating from Wake Forest, Sealy was selected by Kansas City Wizards 11th overall in the 2005 MLS SuperDraft. After three and a half seasons with the Wizards, he was traded to San Jose Earthquakes on 14 July 2008 for an undisclosed amount of allocation money. After playing out the rest of the season with the Quakes, Sealy signed with Israeli side Maccabi Tel Aviv on 2 February 2009. On the same day, he entered as a second-half substitute against Maccabi Haifa, assisting on the equalising goal. On 7 February 2009, he scored the winning goal in his first start, putting the score at 2–1 away against Hapoel Kiryat Shmona.

Sealy returned to play for San Jose Earthquakes in early April 2010 and after an injury first half of the season, put in strong displays in midfield to give San Jose a push for playoffs. Sealy remained with San Jose through the 2011 season. At season's end, the club declined his 2012 contract option and he entered the 2011 MLS Re-Entry Draft. Sealy was not selected in the draft and became a free agent.

Sealy signed a contract with FC Dallas for 2012 season. After the conclusion of the 2012 season, Dallas declined the 2013 option on Sealy's contract and he entered the 2012 MLS Re-Entry Draft. Sealy became a free agent after he went undrafted in both rounds of the draft.

International
Sealy is also a member of the Trinidad and Tobago national team.

Honours
 Toto Cup:
 2008/09

Career statistics

International goals 
Scores and results list Trinidad and Tobago's goal tally first.

References

External links
 
 Scott Sealy profile on IFA official website
 
 Goal

1981 births
Living people
Trinidad and Tobago footballers
Trinidad and Tobago international footballers
Wake Forest Demon Deacons men's soccer players
Sporting Kansas City players
San Jose Earthquakes players
Maccabi Tel Aviv F.C. players
Bnei Sakhnin F.C. players
FC Dallas players
Expatriate footballers in Israel
Expatriate soccer players in the United States
Major League Soccer players
Sporting Kansas City draft picks
Israeli Premier League players
Association football forwards